Shubho Mahurat (2003) is an Indian Bengali mystery thriller film directed by Rituparno Ghosh. The film is based on Agatha Christie's 1962 Miss Marple detective novel The Mirror Crack'd from Side to Side. It won two National Film award including Best Feature film in Bengali.

Plot
The phrase "Shubho Mahurat" is associated with the beginning of shooting for a feature film. The first shot is marked by a grand reception. This Miss Marple-esque film begins with this event. An NRI producer, Padmini Chowdhury (Sharmila Tagore), has come to India to invest in a film. Her second husband Sambit Roy (Sumanta Mukherjee), an out-of-work director, is assigned the job of direction.

The out-of-work director has a shady past. A witness to his shady past is an aspiring actor, who was subsequently thrown out of the acting circuit. This actor started a catering service for the film unit.

The NRI producer insists on casting a retired actress, Kakoli (Kalyani Mandal) in a prominent role. Kakoli, a drug addict, subsequently dies under mysterious circumstances, on the day of 'Shubho Mahurat'. The journalist Mallika Sen (Nandita Das) is the only person present at the time of the death. The suspicion naturally falls on the husband of the actress, who reportedly has an amorous relationship with another lady.

The unnatural death of the actress causes a police investigation. An IPS officer named Arindam (Tota Roy Chowdhury) takes up the investigation. During the course of investigation, Arindam befriends Mallika. Meanwhile, Mallika catches the fancy of a still photographer named Shubhankar (Anindya Chatterjee) who, incidentally, is closely related to the NRI producer.

This NRI producer had a past no less interesting than the other protagonists. The NRI producer was an actress of repute in her heyday. She divorced her husband and left the country to settle abroad. Before that, she had given birth to an abnormal child. The course of the film reveals that she bore a grudge against Kakoli for spreading a contagious disease to her while she was pregnant, resulting in the abnormal child.

Another amorous affair runs parallel to the main theme: The camera assistant was repenting for his past affair with the hairdresser. The hairdresser has her problems and she was extracting money very often from the camera assistant. All through the movie, the aunt of the journalist, Ranga Pishima (Raakhee), gives vital leads to the investigation through deductive logic. She is able to read the mind of the niece correctly. Her valuable inputs finally leads to solve the murder mystery.

Cast
 Sharmila Tagore as Padmini Chowdhury
 Raakhee as Ranga Pishima
 Nandita Das as Mallika Sen
 Tota Roy Chowdhury as Arindam
 Sumanta Mukherjee as Sambit Roy
 Kalyani Mandal as Kakoli
 Rajesh Sharma as Sumit
 Aparajita Adhya as Pramila
 Moumita Gupta as Kalpana
 Anindya Chatterjee as Shubhankar
 Abhijit Guha (director) (special appearance)
 Goutam Ghose (special appearance)
 Soumitra Chattopadhyay (special appearance)
 Subhendu Chattopadhyay (special appearance)
 Madhabi Mukherjee (special appearance)

Awards
 2003 - National Film Award for Best Supporting Actress for Raakhee
 2003 - National Film Award for Best Feature Film in Bengali

References

External links

Bengali-language Indian films
Indian detective films
2003 crime drama films
Films based on Miss Marple books
2003 films
Films featuring a Best Supporting Actress National Film Award-winning performance
Films directed by Rituparno Ghosh
Best Bengali Feature Film National Film Award winners
2000s Bengali-language films
Indian crime drama films